Glyphodes argyraspides is a moth in the family Crambidae. It was described by Tams in 1941. It is found in Uganda.

References

Moths described in 1941
Glyphodes